Klodian Sulollari (born 27 July 1989) is an Albanian footballer who most recently played as a defender for German amateur side TSV Oldenburg.

Club career
Sulollari played for Bylis, Dinamo Tirana and Tërbuni Pukë in the Albanian Superliga.

References

External links
 Profile - FSHF

1989 births
Living people
Footballers from Tirana
Albanian footballers
Albania youth international footballers
Association football central defenders
FK Dinamo Tirana players
KF Adriatiku Mamurrasi players
KF Liria players
KF Bylis Ballsh players
KF Gramshi players
KF Ballkani players
KF Tërbuni Pukë players
Kategoria Superiore players
Kategoria e Parë players
Football Superleague of Kosovo players
Albanian expatriate footballers
Expatriate footballers in Kosovo
Albanian expatriate sportspeople in Kosovo
Expatriate footballers in Germany
Albanian expatriate sportspeople in Germany